The location of the burial place of Genghis Khan (died 18 August 1227) has been the object of much speculation and research. The site remains undiscovered, although it is strongly implied that the most likely location is somewhere in the vicinity of the Mongol sacred mountain of Burkhan Khaldun in the Khentii mountain range.

The Genghis Khan Mausoleum is a temple dedicated to Genghis Khan in modern-day Inner Mongolia, but is not his burial site.

Historical accounts 

According to legend, Genghis Khan asked to be buried without markings or any sign, and after he died, his body was returned to present-day Mongolia.

Marco Polo wrote that, even by the late 13th century, the Mongols did not know the location of the tomb. The Secret History of the Mongols has the year of Genghis Khan's death (1227) but no information concerning his burial.  In the "Travels of Marco Polo" he writes that "It has been an invariable custom, that all the grand khans, and chiefs of the race of Genghis-khan, should be carried for interment to a certain lofty mountain named Altai, and in whatever place they may happen to die, although it should be at the distance of a hundred days' journey, they are nevertheless conveyed thither."

In a frequently recounted tale, Marco Polo tells that the 2,000 slaves that attended to his funeral were killed by the soldiers sent to guard them, and that these soldiers were in turn killed by another group of soldiers which killed anyone and anything that crossed their path, in order to conceal where he was buried. Finally, the legend states that when they reached their destination they committed suicide. This tale does not appear in contemporary sources, however.

Another folkloric legend meanwhile says that a river was diverted over his grave to make it impossible to find, echoing the myth of the burial of the Sumerian King Gilgamesh of Uruk or of the Visigoth leader Alaric. Other tales state that his grave was stampeded over by many horses, that trees were then planted over the site, and that the permafrost also played its part in the hiding of the burial site. The Erdeni Tobchi (1662) claims that Genghis Khan's coffin may have been empty when it arrived in Mongolia. Similarly, the Altan Tobchi (1604) maintains that only his shirt, tent and boots were buried at the mausoleum in the Ordos (Ratchnevsky, p. 143f.).

Turnbull (2003, p. 24) tells another legend in which the grave was re-discovered 30 years after Genghis Khan's death. According to this tale, a young camel was buried with the Khan, and the camel's mother was later found weeping at the grave of its young. Japanese archeologist Shinpei Kato has likewise recounted the tale of the burial of the baby camel, so the parent could lead the Khan's family to the tomb when needed, as being documented in at least one ancient Chinese text.

According to the tradition of the Yuan dynasty, all the great khans of the Mongols were buried in the area around Genghis Khan's tomb. The site's name in Chinese was Qinian Valley. However, the concrete location of the valley is never mentioned in any documents.

Modern research 

More recent scholarship suggests that the burial place of Genghis Khan lies somewhere in the vicinity of the Mongol sacred mountain Burkhan Khaldun (roughly ). This was the sacred place where Genghis Khan went to pray to the sky god Tengri before embarking on his campaign to unite the Mongols and other steppe peoples. After the rise of the Mongol Empire, it then became known as Ikh Khorig, or the Great Taboo, with only the Mongol royal family, or golden family, being permitted entry to the area. In all, a 240 square-kilometre area was sealed off by the Mongols, with trespassing being punishable by death. Even in the Soviet era, the area remained restricted out of fear that the mountain could once again become a site of pilgrimage or a focus for Mongol national identity.

The Ikh Khorig has also been reported as being traditionally guarded by an Uriankhai tribe called the Darkhad that were exempted by the Mongols from taxes and military service. Such guarding of an imperial grave site "undermines the folkloric suggestion that the soldiers who witnessed the funeral were executed.”

Expeditions and investigations

In 1920, the French diplomat Saint-John Perse led an unrelated expedition through Mongolia with Chinese Post general director, Henri Picard Destelan and Dr. Jean-Augustin Bussière, in the footsteps of Genghis Khan.

In 2001, a joint American-Mongolian expedition, organized by a retired Chicago commodity trader Maury Kravitz and assisted by Dr. D. Bazargur of the Genghis Khan Geo-Historical Expedition, found a walled burial ground on a hillside near the town of Batshireet. The location, 200 miles to the east-northeast of Ulan Bator  near the Onon River]] in the foothills of the Hentii Mountains, was close to both Genghis Khan's presumed birthplace and the site where he announced himself as the universal ruler of the Mongols. The site contained at least 20 unopened tombs for high-status individuals. An earlier Japanese expedition had visited the site in the 1990s, but was closed down over popular fears that the scientists planned to dig up the remains.

On 6 October 2004, Genghis Khan's palace was discovered, leading to academic speculation that his burial site could alternatively be located nearby.

In an account of a French Jesuit, Kravitz found a reference to an early battle where Genghis Khan, at the time still known as Temüjin, won a decisive victory. According to this source, the location was at the confluence of the Kherlen and "Bruchi" rivers, with Burkhan Khaldun over his right shoulder and after his victory, Temüjin said that this place would be forever his favourite. Kravitz, convinced that Temüjin's grave would be near that battlefield, attempted to find the "Bruchi" river, which turned out to be unknown to cartographers.

In January 2015, Dr Albert Yu-Min Lin from the California Institute for Telecommunications and Information Technology at the University of California, San Diego set up a project asking anyone interested to tag potential sites of the burial through images taken from space. The project resulted in the publication of a paper in the journal Public Library of Science One that claimed to have identified 55 archaeological sites that could potentially be the final resting place of Genghis Khan.

In 2015 and 2016, two expeditions led by French archeologist Pierre-Henri Giscard, a specialist in Mongolian archeology, and Raphaël Hautefort, a specialist in scientific imaging, around the Khentii mountains (North East of Mongolia) support the theory of a tumulus at the top of the Burkhan Khaldun mountain. Their non-invasive analysis, carried out with drones, showed that the -long tumulus is of human origin and probably built on the model of the Chinese imperial tombs present in Xi'an. In addition, the expedition noted that the mound was still the subject of religious rites and pilgrimages of the surrounding population. The expedition did not give rise to any scientific publication by Pierre-Henri Giscard because it was made without authorization, and without informing local authorities, as access to the area around Burkhan Khaldun remains strictly controlled by the Mongolian government due to the sacredness of the area for the local population.

In popular culture
 The plot of the 1932 American film The Mask of Fu Manchu turns on the discovery and entry of Genghis Khan's tomb, which contains a golden sword and mask that the evil doctor needs to accomplish world conquest.

References

External links
 Why Genghis Khan’s tomb can’t be found? BBC.
 Where is the tomb of Genghis Khan? Live Science.

Genghis Khan
Yuan dynasty
History of Mongolia
Asian archaeology
Lost objects
Tombs